Poihākena is a Māori language name which can refer to:

the Māori name for Sydney
Poihākena Marae in Raglan

Māori words and phrases